The Faction Collective (also known as Faction Skis) is a manufacturer of freeride skis, poles and skiing-related products, based in Verbier, Switzerland. The company's products are sold in over 31 countries through their website and through distributors.

History 
Faction Skis was founded by a group of skiers in 2006 in Verbier, Switzerland. In 2013, Faction Skis teamed up with French professional skier Candide Thovex to develop a range of signature ski models.

Films 
The Faction Collective produced three seasons of their web series "We Are The Faction Collective".

In 2017, the company produced the feature film THIS IS HOME featuring skiers Candide Thovex, Kelly Sildaru, and Antti Ollila among others. The film was shot in different locations, including Flathead Valley in Montana, Jyväskylä in Finland, Wasatch Mountains in Utah, La Clusaz in France, Deštné v Orlických horách in the Czech Republic and Zermatt and Verbier in Switzerland. THIS IS HOME was nominated for multiple awards by the Powder Awards, iF3 International Freeski Festival, including Film of the Year, People's Choice, Best Male Street Segment (Antti Ollila) and Discovery of the Year (Alex Hall).

In 2019, Faction produced its second full-length feature film called THE COLLECTIVE featuring skiers Alex Hall, Antti Ollila, Olympic skier Sarah Höfflin, Kelly Sildaru and Sam Anthamatten. The film was nominated for Film of the Year, Best Cinematography, Best Make Freeride Segment (Sam Anthamatten) and Best Male Street Segment (Alex Hall) by the  IF3 International Freeski Film Festival and nominated for Best Film at the High Five Awards.

Team 
Faction's current pro team consists of  Kelly Sildaru, Sam Anthamatten, Eileen Gu, Sarah Hoefflin, Antti Ollila, Alex Hall, Henry Sildaru and others.

Product 
The company currently offers several All-Mountain, Freeride, Freestyle and Touring models. They also offer a range of accessories such as poles, skins and clothing.

References 

Sporting goods manufacturers of Switzerland
Sportswear brands